is a railway station in the city of Akita, Akita Prefecture,  Japan, operated by JR East.

Lines

Station layout
The station has a side platform and an island platform connected by a footbridge.  The station is unattended.

Platforms

History
Shimohama Station opened on February 22, 1920. With the privatization of JNR on April 1, 1987, the station came under the control of JR East.

Surrounding area
 
 Shimohama Post Office
 Shimohama Beach

See also
List of railway stations in Japan

References

External links

 JR East Station information 

Railway stations in Japan opened in 1920
Railway stations in Akita Prefecture
Uetsu Main Line
Buildings and structures in Akita (city)